The Big 12 Conference sponsors championships in 23 sports, 10 men's and 13 women's. The first conference championship awarded was the 1996 softball postseason tournament championship, which was won by Oklahoma.

From 2011 through 2016, the football champion was decided by regular-season play. Previously divisional titles were awarded based on regular-season conference results, with the teams with the best conference records from the North and South playing in the Big 12 Championship Game for the Big 12 title. Following changes in NCAA rules, the Big 12 will reinstate its football championship game in 2017, with the top two teams in the final conference standings advancing to the title game. Baseball, basketball, soccer, and tennis titles are awarded in both regular-season and tournament play. Cross country, golf, gymnastics, rowing, swimming and diving, track and field, and wrestling titles are awarded during an annual meet of participating teams. The volleyball and softball titles are awarded based on regular-season play. Softball previously held a post season tournament.

Current membership
All-Time Big 12 Championships by university through July 1, 2022. Oklahoma and Texas will leave the Big 12 after the 2023–24 school year to join the Southeastern Conference (SEC).

Future members
Four schools will join the conference on July 1, 2023.
 BYU Cougars
 Cincinnati Bearcats
 Houston Cougars
 UCF Knights

Former members

Sports

Baseball

All current and future Big 12 members sponsor baseball except Iowa State, which dropped the sport after the 2001 season. All former Big 12 members sponsored the sport throughout their tenures in the conference except Colorado, which never sponsored baseball during its time in the Big 12.

Men's basketball

Baylor won the Big 12 Conference Tile along w Kansas in 2022

Women's basketball

Men's cross country

All Big 12 schools sponsor men's cross country except West Virginia. Of the four future members, only UCF does not sponsor the sport.

Women's cross country
All current and future Big 12 schools sponsor women's cross country.

Women's equestrian
Kansas State discontinued its equestrian team after the 2016 season.

Current football members

Previous football members

This list reflects the official Big 12 totals by including division championships (1996–2010), conference championships won through a postseason championship game (1996–2010 and 2017–present), and conference championships won through the regular season (2011–2016).

The Big 12 counts shared division championships as a full championship for each school, regardless of what school went on to play in the Big 12 title game.

Big 12 Championship Game (1996–2010, 2017–present)

Note: While the team playing in the championship game from 1996 through 2010 was popularly regarded as the divisional champion, the Big 12 did officially recognize co-champions in football, just like it does in other sports. As a result, the following teams are also recognized as champions by the Big 12:
North Co-Champions: Kansas State (1999), Nebraska (2000, 2001, 2008), Iowa State (2004), Kansas (2007), Missouri (2010)
South Co-Champions: Texas (2002, 2008), Texas Tech (2008), Oklahoma State (2010), Texas A&M (2010)

2011–2016

When Nebraska and Colorado left the conference after the 2010 season, it left the conference with only 10 members. The conference did not replace the two teams and therefore eliminated the Big 12 Championship game. Under the new format, which remained in place through the 2016 season, every team played each other and the team with the best conference record won the Big 12 title. In the event of a tie between two teams or more teams for the best conference record, then they were determined co-champions.  Through the 2013 season, the winner of the head-to-head game earned the BCS berth in the Fiesta Bowl. This was later changed and the league recognized a tie-breaker starting in 2015. The change was made after the B12 was left out of the inaugural four-team College Football Playoff in 2014. The B12 presented TCU and Baylor as co-champs to the College Football Committee in 2014, despite Baylor having the head-to-head win over TCU. The move was seen as a play by the conference to get two teams invited into the new format, which backfired, leaving both teams out.

Following a 2016 change in NCAA rules that allowed FBS conferences to stage championship games regardless of their membership numbers, the Big 12 announced it would reinstate its championship game starting in 2017. The conference continues to play a full round-robin conference schedule. The top two teams at the end of the conference season (with tiebreakers used as needed) play in the championship game.

With the launch of the College Football Playoff (CFP) in 2014, which coincided with a reworking of bowl tie-ins, the Big 12 tie to the Fiesta Bowl ended.
 The Big 12's primary bowl partner is now the Sugar Bowl, In years when that game is not a CFP semifinal, the top teams from the Big 12 and SEC, as chosen by the CFP selection committee, will play one another. If either conference provides a team for the CFP semifinals, the top non-playoff team from that conference will go to the Sugar Bowl.
 When the Sugar Bowl is hosting a semifinal, the top Big 12 team not involved in the playoff will receive a berth in either the Cotton Bowl, Fiesta Bowl, or Peach Bowl.

Big 12 Champions (2011–2016)

Note: * Head to head winner

Men's golf

All current and future Big 12 members sponsor men's golf. The most recent school to add the sport while a Big 12 member is West Virginia, which added that sport starting in the 2015–16 season.

Women's golf
All current and future Big 12 members sponsor women's golf except West Virginia.

Women's gymnastics
The Big 12 currently has four women's gymnastics members—full members Iowa State, Oklahoma, and West Virginia, plus Denver, an affiliate since the 2015–16 season. Incoming full member BYU sponsors the sport; Oklahoma will leave for the SEC after the 2023–24 season.

Rowing
In the 2014–15 school year, rowing was the only Big 12 sport with affiliate members. Before that school year, the Big 12 and Conference USA (C-USA) had a rowing alliance in which all Big 12 rowing schools would participate in the C-USA championship as well as the Big 12 championship. C-USA dropped rowing after the departure of most of its rowing members for other conferences. The Big 12 then took in the three remaining schools from the C-USA rowing league (Alabama, Old Dominion, and Tennessee) as single-sport affiliates. Old Dominion left Big 12 rowing after the 2017–18 season to join the American Athletic Conference. Of the four schools joining in July 2023, only UCF sponsors the sport.

Since 2015–16, the Big 12 has also had affiliates in women's gymnastics and wrestling.

The departure of Oklahoma and Texas in 2024 for the SEC would allow that conference  to begin sponsoring women's rowing. Both current affiliates (Alabama and Tennessee) are charter SEC members, and SEC bylaws allow it to hold a championship in any sport sponsored by four schools. The SEC has not yet announced whether it will sponsor the sport.

Women's soccer

All current and future Big 12 members sponsor women's soccer. The most recent to add the sport was Kansas State, which announced in 2015 that it was adding the sport. The Wildcats played their first season in 2016 as an independent, and began playing a full Big 12 schedule in 2017.

Softball

Seven Big 12 schools currently sponsor softball; Kansas State, TCU, and West Virginia do not. Of the four future Big 12 members, only Cincinnati does not have a softball team.

Reference:

Men's swimming and diving
Three Big 12 schools currently sponsor men's swimming & diving: TCU, Texas, and West Virginia. The Big 12 men's swimming membership will increase to five in July 2023 with the arrival of BYU and Cincinnati, and will drop to four a year later with the departure of Texas.

Women's swimming & diving
Five Big 12 schools currently sponsor women's swimming and diving: Iowa State, Kansas, TCU, Texas, and West Virginia. Three future members (BYU, Cincinnati, and Houston) sponsor the sport. Texas will leave after the 2023–24 season to join the SEC.

Men's tennis
Six current Big 12 members sponsor men's tennis; Iowa State, the Kansas schools, and West Virginia do not. Future members BYU and UCF also sponsor the sport.

Women's tennis
All current and future Big 12 members sponsor women's tennis.

Reference:

Men's track and field
All current and future Big 12 members sponsor men's track and field except West Virginia and UCF.

Women's track & field
All current and future Big 12 members sponsor women's track and field.

Women's volleyball
All current and future Big 12 members sponsor women's volleyball except Oklahoma State, which has never sponsored women's volleyball as a Big 12 member; Oklahoma State and Vanderbilt are the only two schools in the Power Five conferences that do not sponsor women's volleyball, and Vanderbilt (which dropped women's volleyball after the 1979 season) will reinstate the sport in the 2025 season. The only current or future member with a varsity men's team is BYU.

Nebraska left the conference in 2011.

Wrestling
Wrestling crowned regular-season champions in 2011–12 and 2012–13 only.

In 2015, the Big 12 absorbed the Western Wrestling Conference, with that league's six final members becoming Big 12 affiliates effective with the 2015–16 school year. Fresno State and Northern Iowa became affiliates in 2017–18. Missouri became an affiliate during the 2021-22 season after Fresno State dropped its program, and California Baptist became an affiliate in 2022–23 once it completed its transition from NCAA Division II to Division I.

See also
 List of Big Eight Conference champions – previous conference of 8 charter members of Big 12
 List of Southwest Conference champions – previous conference of 4 charter members of Big 12

Notes
†denotes shared title

References

Big 12 Conference
Big 12